The Standard Snowboard Show is an American sports documentary television series airing on the Big Ten Network, Fox Sports Net, and various other members of the Fox Cable Networks. It is filmed at numerous snowboarding sites worldwide including Canada and New Zealand.

Each action-fortified episode takes viewers into the most dangerous and spectacular locations where big mountain experts conquer avalanche-prone descents around the globe.  A driving score matches stunning cinematography and an entertaining format, which mixes in compelling profiles and feature segments, all focusing on the exciting world of freestyle and big mountain snowboarding.

External links

 http://www.billabonggirls-usa.com/blog-post/1554/the-standard-snowboard-show--starring-jamie-anderson--jenny-jones

2003 American television series debuts
2000s American documentary television series
2010s American documentary television series
American sports television series
English-language television shows